Aliaksei Leanidavich Kuchuk (Aleksei Leonidovich Kuchuk; born 9 September 1986) is a Belarusian football coach and former player.

He is a son of Belarusian coach Leonid Kuchuk.

Career
In April 2014, signed for Kazakhstan Premier League side Atyrau, leaving Atyrau in June on the same year.

Honours
Sheriff Tiraspol
Moldovan National Division champion: 2004–05, 2005–06, 2006–07, 2007–08, 2008–09, 2009–10
Moldovan Cup winner: 2005–06, 2007–08, 2009–10
Moldovan Super Cup winner: 2005, 2007

Individual
Moldovan National Division top scorer: 2005–06, 2006–07

References

External links
 Profile

1986 births
Living people
Footballers from Minsk
Belarusian footballers
Association football forwards
Belarusian expatriate footballers
Belarusian expatriate sportspeople in Moldova
Belarusian expatriate sportspeople in Latvia
Expatriate footballers in Moldova
Expatriate footballers in Russia
Expatriate footballers in Latvia
Expatriate footballers in Portugal
Expatriate footballers in Kazakhstan
Moldovan Super Liga players
Russian Premier League players
FC SKVICH Minsk players
FC Sheriff Tiraspol players
FC Kuban Krasnodar players
FK Ventspils players
FC Belshina Bobruisk players
FC Vitebsk players
FC Yenisey Krasnoyarsk players
S.C. Beira-Mar players
FC Atyrau players
Belarusian football managers
FC Krumkachy Minsk managers